

Biography 

Born in Tehran to a family passionate about art, Reza Jenab, his father, was a highly esteemed, patriotic army officer and Parvin Dokht Banisadr, his mother, was a loving and caring parent.

Growing up, his French grandmother, a musician and enthusiastic artist, fostered his love of painting. He received training from Master Changiz Shahvagh and went on to attend Alborz High School, where he graduated with a degree in Mathematics. Beginning his higher education at the University of Tehran, he elected Graphic Design as his major, eventually graduating with a Bachelor's degree from the Faculty of Fine Arts. During his undergraduate program, he had the opportunity to work with renowned professors such as Momayez, Ehsaei and Shabahangi. His background in Mathematics in high school gave him a unique perspective on art and his artwork stood out among the other students, catching the professors' attention. As an example, his illustrations of Rumi’s poem in the thesis section allowed him to become familiar with other well-known professors, such as Homayi, who then invited him to join Molana’s commentary sessions. His academic achievements earned him an honors student status and a scholarship from the United States, which opened up new doors of knowledge and experience for him.

He fell in love with Mrs. Shohreh Lahbi from Shiraz city before he moved to the United States, and they got married in (1977). She supported him in his career, and her influence on his success was immense. The marriage resulted in two wonderful daughters, Javaneh and Talayeh, who both graduated from the American university in Dubai. Javaneh graduated with a degree in Business, and Talayeh studied graphic Design.

When Bijan Jenab returned from America, he was the first professor to teach in the newly launched Illustration Graduate Program at the University of Tehran. In 1986, he opened his Jenab Graphic Design studio, and with the trust and backing of esteemed clients, he became a highly esteemed professional graphic designer in a variety of industrial and cultural events. It is true to say that Bijan Jenab pioneered a new way of approaching Digital Graphic Design in the country, incorporating the very latest technology of the time, such as airbrush and the first generation of Apple computer      

Bijan Jenab (born January 2, 1952, in Tehran, Iran) is an Iranian graphic designer and professor at the School of Fine Arts at Tehran University, Al Zahra University and at Islamic Free University Radio/Television. He is one of the founding members of Iranian Graphic Design Society and currently serves as a jury member.

Education
Bijan is a graduate of Tehran University and holds a master's degree from Iowa State University on a full scholarship from Alavi Foundation.

Jenab design studio

The 'Bijan Jenab Design Studio', specialized in the conception, creation, and production of graphic design, is a pioneer in the field. Its objective is always the same: offering the opportunity to present a favorable image of any corporation, institution, organization or individual to intended audiences. The business world has never been as competitive as today, which means employing sophisticated design and creativity is the only way to help an organization live up to its potentials.
Here at 'Bijan Jenab Design Studio' fine art is deploying to leverage the client's products and services to a more prestigious level. The studio produces artworks conformed to the specifications under the supervision of Bijan Jenab, a well-known artist with a sensitive and creative mastery of graphic art.
Bijan Jenab has gathered a notable and acknowledged team in the studio under one main attitude: meeting the client's requirements and fortune. To create artwork with the most effective impact for audiences, the expert studio staff utilizes the latest technology
and techniques. A perfect management completes this set and provides a piece of art in the highest standards in the world class for the clients.
A full range design service – produced through various means and media – is offered to make graphics, tailored to the client's interests. Applying special consideration in selection of art for corporations, organizations, private or execution offices, high quality performance is provided here, conveying a desired message to the gathered audiences.

Awards and notable work
Jenab was awarded the Golden Plate from the Tehran International Poster Biennial and is the winner of Design and Production Management in the International Design and Production Exhibition in Tehran in 2000. He has received letters of appreciation from UNICEF for poster design in 1991; for the logo design of the Iranian Society of Gynecologic Oncology in 2004; and from Iowa State University for the best senior project on the Tehran Film Festival in 1980. He has been a regular art contributor at Iran Film Festival with his art. Jenab has been the book designer for some of the famous and leading book publications from Iran including Tehran Past & Present, Aydin Aghdashloo, Contemporary Pottery of Iran, The First Tehran International Contemporary Drawing Exhibition, and From California To Abyaneh.

Compilations

 Packaging Design  Fatemi Pub. 2021

Books 
 Ahmad Vosough Ahmadi     Selected  Painting         Negar Books
 Isfahan pearl of Iran          Yassavoli Publications
 Hojjat Shakiba   Selected Painting           Negar Books
 Mahmoud Farshchian    Selected Painting          Negar Books
 Mohammad Reza Atashzad          Negar Books
 Shirin Ettehadieh    Selected Painting 1980-2007         Mahriz Publish
 Ali Akbar Sadeghi  Selected Works1977-97        Iranian- Art Publishing
 Parviz Tanavoli  Sculptor  Writer & Collector       Iranian Art Publishing
 Abbas Kiarostami  Photo Collection          Iranian Art Publishing
 Four Views  Images Of Iran       Iranian Art Publishing
 Parvaneh Etemadi  Selected Works 2960-98         Iranian Art Publishing
 Silver Cyprus 2013. Aban Book Publication. 2000. .
 Hamid Reza, Norouzi Talab. Tehran Past & Present (Az Tehran ta Tehran). Yassavoli; 2nd edition (2010). p. 203. .
 Aydin, Aghdashloo (2012). The Negaristan Collection. Iran: Negar Books. p. 26..
 Daii, Nader (2004). From California To Abyaneh. Yassavoli. p. 120..
 Iran of Iranian (2016).  Photography book
 Cover Design      Strategy Builder: How to make and communicate more effective strategies, 2015           Rasa Books
 NEGAR- E- JAVIDAN (2017)  The Life and Works of Master Mahmoud Farshchian, Forwarded and Prologue by: Mahmoud Farshchian and Seyyed Hossein Nasr      Farhangsara Mirdashti
 Aran & Bidgol (2017)      Maranjab Publishing

Activity
 Jury member at Graphic Designers 3rd Biennial
 Jury member at Graphic Designers 4th Biennial 
 Graphic Designers 5th Biennial 
 Graphic Designers 7th Biennial 
 SilverCypress Exhibition 2013 Teaching at Tehran University (Faculty of Fine Arts) 
 Al Zahra University (Art Faculty) 
 Islamic Free University (Radio/Television Faculty)
 Jury member at  SARVE NOGHREI 3rd Biennial

Group exhibition
 Graphic designers 2nd Biennial, 1989 
 Artist's exhibition to help the victims of an earthquake in the north of Iran, 1990
 Graphic Designers 3rd Biennial
 Graphic Designers 4th Biennial
 Graphic Designers 5th Biennial 
 Graphic Designers 6th Biennial
 Graphic Designers 7th Biennial
 SARVE NOGHREI 3rd Biennial

References

External links 
 
 
 behance
 
 

Iranian graphic designers
1952 births
Living people
Iranian photographers
Iranian expatriate academics
Academic staff of the University of Tehran
Art educators
People from Tehran
Iranian poster artists